In mathematics, in particular number theory, an odd composite number N is a Somer–Lucas d-pseudoprime (with given d ≥ 1) if there exists a nondegenerate Lucas sequence  with the discriminant  such that  and the rank appearance of N in the sequence U(P, Q) is

where  is the Jacobi symbol.

Applications
Unlike the standard Lucas pseudoprimes, there is no known efficient primality test using the Lucas d-pseudoprimes.  Hence they are not generally used for computation.

See also
Lawrence Somer, in his 1985 thesis, also defined the Somer d-pseudoprimes.  They are described in brief on page 117 of Ribenbaum 1996.

References 
 
 
 
 

Pseudoprimes